The 2014 Girl's Under 15 Australian Championships was a field hockey tournament held in the Gold Coast, Queensland between 11–19 April 2015.

QLD 1 won the gold medal by defeating WA Gold 2–1 in the final. QLD 2 won the bronze medal by defeating WA Black 3–2 in the third and fourth place playoff.

Competition format
The tournament is divided into three pools, Pool A, Pool B and Pool C, consisting of four teams each, competing in a round-robin format.

At the conclusion of the pool stage, all four teams from Pool A, and the top two ranked teams from Pool B and Pool C advance to the medal round, while bottom ranked teams from Pool B and Pool C progress to the non medal round.

In Pools D, E and F, teams once again play in a round-robin format to determine playoff matches. The top two teams in Pool D and Pool E progress to the semi-finals, while the bottom two advance to the fifth to eighth place classification. At the conclusion of Pool F, teams play in crossover matches to determine classification matches.

Teams
Unlike other National Australian Championships, teams from New South Wales, Queensland, Victoria and Western Australia are eligible to enter two teams.

  ACT
  NSW State
  NSW Blue
  NT
  QLD 1
  QLD 2
  SA
  TAS
  VIC Blue
  VIC White
  WA Black
  WA Gold

Results

First round

Pool A

Pool B

Pool C

Medal round

Pool D

Pool E

Non-Medal Round

Pool F

Classification matches

Ninth to twelfth place classification

Crossover

Eleventh and twelfth place

Ninth and tenth place

Fifth to eighth place classification

Crossover

Seventh and eighth place

Fifth and sixth place

First to fourth place classification

Semi-finals

Third and fourth place

Final

Statistics

Final standings

References

Women's field hockey competitions in Australia
2015 in Australian women's field hockey